is a junction passenger railway station located in Nakahara Ward, Kawasaki, Kanagawa Prefecture, Japan and operated by the private railway company Tokyu Corporation.

Lines
Shin-Maruko Station is served by the Tōkyū Tōyoko Line and is 10.3 kilometers (6.4 mi) from the starting point of the line at Shibuya. It is also served by the Tōkyū Meguro Line and is 8.6 kilometers (5.3 mi) from the terminus of that line at Meguro Station.

Station layout
The station consists of two island platforms serving four tracks with an elevated station building. The Meguro Line trains uses the inner platforms 2 and 3, which are equipped with Platform screen doors. The Tōyoko Line uses the outer platforms 1 and 4.

Platforms

History
Shin-Maruko Station opened as one of the original Tōyoko Line stations on February 14, 1926.

Passenger statistics
In fiscal 2019, the station was used by an average of 27,539 passengers daily. 

The daily average passenger figures for previous years are as shown below.

Surrounding area
Sumiyoshi Shrine
Kanto Workers' Health and Safety Hospital
Tokyu Corporation Former Sumiyoshi Depot
Tokyu Driving School / Train Driver Training Center
Kanagawa Prefectural Sumiyoshi High School
Hosei University Second Junior and Senior High School

See also
 List of railway stations in Japan

References

External links

 

Railway stations in Kanagawa Prefecture
Railway stations in Japan opened in 1926
Tokyu Toyoko Line
Tokyu Meguro Line
Stations of Tokyu Corporation
Railway stations in Kawasaki, Kanagawa